Sripada Pinakapaani (3 August 1913 – 11 March 2013), was a medical doctor, administrator, professor in medicine, and carnatic musician.  He received Sangeetha Kalanidhi award in 1983.

Pinkapani was born at Priya Agraharam of Srikakulam district. He spent three months in violin maestro Dwaram Venkataswamy Naidu's school. He joined M.B.B.S. in 1932. He completed M.D. in general medicine in December 1945 also from Andhra Medical College, under Andhra University, Visakhapatnam.

Pinakapani worked as assistant professor at Madras Medical College from 1944 to 1949 and later at Andhra Medical College. He opted for Andhra Services and resigned to rejoin in the same post in 1951. He held the position of Professor of Medicine on 17 May 1954 and later transferred to Kurnool Medical College on 26 January 1957 and retired in the same position on 2 August 1968.

Pinkapani had a successful career performing at major festivals and concerts.  His disciples include carnatic vocalists, Nedunuri Krishnamurthy, Nookala Chinna Satyanarayana, Voleti Venkatesvarulu, Srirangam Gopalaratnam, the Malladi Brothers and many others. He wrote several books on carnatic music and Gaanakalasarvasvamu ran multiple volumes which had every minute detail of krithis.
He is the paternal grandfather of singer Chinmayi Sripada.

He died on 11 March 2013 in Kurnool, Andhra Pradesh, at the age of 99, a few months short of completing 100.

Awards
 He was awarded Gyana Vidya Vardhi by Tirumala Tirupati Devasthanams on 3 August 2012 on the occasion of his 99th birthday.
 He received the title of Sangeetha Kalanidhi (Treasure for the art of music).
 He received the Sangeetha Kalasikhamani award in 1970 bestowed on him by The Indian Fine Arts Society, Chennai.
 He has been honoured with Sangeet Natak Akademi Award in 1983  in 1977.
 He was awarded Padma Bhushan by Government of India in 1984.
 Andhra University honored him with Kala Prapoorna in 1978.
 He was honoured with Sangeet Natak Akademi Tagore Ratna in 2011

Books written
Sangeetha Sourabhamu, (vol 1 – 4)
Sangeetha Yatra
Mela Raga malika
Manodharma sangeetham
Pallavi Gana sudha.

References

External links
 
 Music greats fete Pinakapani, The Hindu, 28 November 2005
 For him, music is worship, The Hindu, 3 November 2006
  
 gaana vidyaa vaaridhi, Eamaata, September, 2012

1913 births
2013 deaths
20th-century Indian medical doctors
Telugu people
20th-century Indian male classical singers
Recipients of the Padma Bhushan in arts
Carnatic violinists
People from Srikakulam
Musicians from Karnataka
Andhra University alumni
Recipients of the Sangeet Natak Akademi Award